Charles Katz (born in 1927) is an American mathematician and computer scientist known for his contributions to early compiler development in the 1950s.

He received two degrees in mathematics, a Bachelor of Science (B.S.) at Temple University in 1950, and a Master of Science (M.S.) at the University of Pennsylvania in 1953. He then went to work at Remington Rand, in the UNIVAC division, with Grace Hopper to develop compilers for her A-0 system UNIVAC programming languages starting with A-2, followed by MATH-MATIC and FLOW-MATIC. He then went on to General Electric, Burroughs Corporation, and Xerox.

In 1958, he served as one of the original four US members of the International Federation for Information Processing (IFIP) IFIP Working Group 2.1 on Algorithmic Languages and Calculi, which specified, supports, and maintains the languages ALGOL 60 and ALGOL 68.

References

1927 births
American computer programmers
Living people
Temple University alumni
University of Pennsylvania alumni